Josias Lima is a paralympic athlete from Brazil competing mainly in category F52 throwing events.

Josias was part of the Brazilian team that attended the 1996 Summer Paralympics in Atlanta.  There he competed in all three throws finishing ninth in the F55 Discus, sixth in the F55 javelin and won the silver medal in the F52 shot put that was won by New Zealand's Peter Martin in a new world record distance.

References

External links
 

Year of birth missing (living people)
Living people
Paralympic athletes of Brazil
Paralympic silver medalists for Brazil
Paralympic medalists in athletics (track and field)
Athletes (track and field) at the 1996 Summer Paralympics
Medalists at the 1996 Summer Paralympics
Brazilian male discus throwers
Brazilian male javelin throwers
Brazilian male shot putters
20th-century Brazilian people
21st-century Brazilian people